Acantholipes regulatrix is a species of moth in the family Erebidae. It is found in Afghanistan.

References

regulatrix
Moths described in 1961
Moths of Asia